Putana is a demoness in Hindu mythology.

Putana may also refer to:
Putana Volcano, Chile
Prostitute